Tomás Saraceno (San Miguel de Tucumán, 1973) is an Argentine contemporary artist whose projects, consisting of floating sculptures, international collaborations, and interactive installations, propose and dialogue with forms of inhabiting and sensing the environment that have been suppressed in the Capitalocene era.

For more than two decades, Saraceno has activated projects aimed towards an ethical collaboration with the atmosphere, including the sculpture series Cloud Cities (2002–) and Museo Aero Solar (2007–), a community-organised initiative that transforms waste plastic bags into flying, aerosolar sculptures. These projects later grew into the Aerocene Foundation, a non-profit organization devoted to community building, scientific research and artistic experiences. Together with Saraceno in 2020, Aerocene launched the certified, untethered flight Fly with Aerocene Pacha, achieving thirty-two world records across Female and General categories for the flight's distance, duration and altitude—lifted using only the heat of the sun and the air.

Saraceno is also known for his interest in spiders and their webs, which led to the formation of the interdisciplinary community Arachnophilia, a research-driven initiative that refines concepts and ideas related to spider/webs across different forms of knowledge and multiple artistic, scientific and theoretical disciplines. Notably, Saraceno collaborated with researchers at the Photogrammetric Institute of TU Darmstadt to develop the Spider/Web Scan, a novel, tomographic technique that allowed, for the first time ever, precise 3D models to be made of complex spider webs. Through Arachnophilia, Saraceno engages international audiences to develop more profound understandings of the role spiders play within our cosmic web of life, through initiatives such as Mapping Against Extinction as presented in the project's Arachnomancy App.

Education and artistic career 
Tomás Saraceno studied architecture at Universidad Nacional de Buenos Aires between 1992 and 1999, after which he studied art and architecture in a postgraduate program at Escuela Superior de Bellas Artes de la Nación Ernesto de la Cárcova – both courses were taken in Buenos Aires. Saraceno then moved to Europe to complete his postgraduate studies at Germany's Städelschule. There, he was directed by Daniel Birnbaum (curator of the 53rd Venice Biennale) and studied under professors Thomas Bayrle and Ben van Berkel.

Saraceno's first installations were exhibited at the Venice Biennale of Architecture in 2002 and again at the Venice Arte Biennale in 2003, as well as at the São Paulo Biennale of 2006. In 2003–2004 Saraceno participated in the course "Progettazione e Produzione delle Arti Visive" (Design and Production of Visual Arts), held by Hans Ulrich Obrist and Olafur Eliasson at Instituto Universitario di Architettura di Venezia (IUAV).

The artist established his studio in Frankfurt am Main in 2005 and later relocated to Berlin in 2012, where he moved into the former administrative building of Actien-Gesellschaft für Anilin-Fabrication (AGFA) in Berlin-Rummelsburg. A team of studio members from multidisciplinary backgrounds, including designers, architects, anthropologists, biologists, engineers, art historians, writers, and musicians, work directly with Saraceno in the studio's hybrid environment.

In 2009, he attended the International Space Studies Program at NASA Center Ames (Silicon Valley, California). That same year, Saraceno exhibited in the 53rd Arte Venice Biennale "Fare Mondi/Making Worlds", curated by Daniel Birnbaum, and won the Calder Prize.

In the past two decades Saraceno has collaborated with the Massachusetts Institute of Technology, Max Planck Institute, Nanyang Technological University, Imperial College London and the Natural History Museum London.

He has lectured in institutions worldwide, and directed the Institute of Architecture‐related Art (IAK) at Braunschweig University of Technology, Germany (2014–2016)

He has held residencies at Centre National d’Études Spatiales (CNES) (2014–2015), MIT Center for Art, Science & Technology (2012–ongoing) and Atelier Calder (2010).

Aerocene 
The Aerocene Foundation is a non-profit initiative initiated by Tomás Saraceno in 2015, that aims to explore environmental issues scientifically and artistically through a diverse international community of artists, architects, geographers, philosophers, thinkers, speculative scientists, explorers, balloonists and technologists. The project's activities include the testing and circulation of aerosolar sculptures that are lifted into the by the heat of the Sun and infrared radiation from the Earth's surface.

Aerosolar sculptures were officially presented during the United Nations Climate Change Conference COP21, at Grand Palais, Paris, 2015, after that a similar prototype has been tested in November at the White Sands Dunes of New Mexico. On November 8, 2015, it broke world records by achieving the longest and most sustainable certified flight (without fossil-fuel, solar panel, helium or batteries) ever registered:  During approximately 2 hours and 15 minutes, seven people were lifted up in White Sands' desert landscape. With a net lift of more than 250 kg, the payload of the "D-O AEC Aerocene" solar sculpture has no precedent in the long history of manned solar balloon flight attempts.

The project has evolved from Tomás Saraceno's residency at L'Observatoire de l'Espace, CNES. Led by Saraceno, the project's team is composed of leading scientists and engineers, including collaboration with Massachusetts Institute of Technology - Department of Earth, Atmospheric and Planetary Sciences (EAPS), Braunschweig University of Technology - Institute of Architecture-related Art (IAK), TBA21 Academy, Red Cross Red Crescent, and numerous universities, research centers, cultural and art institutions, and museums around the world.

Fly with Aerocene Pacha 
On January 28, 2020, from Salar de Uyuni in Salinas Grandes of Jujuy, Argentina, Saraceno led the world's first manned solar-powered free flight during Fly with Aerocene Pacha.

Using only solar energy and air, pilot Leticia Marques lifted from the ground with Saraceno's aerosolar sculpture titled Aerocene Pacha. Aerosolar balloon technology, free of any dependency on carbon fossil fuel derivatives, utilised the heat of the sun's rays to warm the air inside the balloon, further amplified by the salt lake's reflective white surface. The flight set thirty-two world records within sixteen minutes, certified by The Fédération Aéronautique Internationale (FAI) in Class A (Free balloons) across Female and General categories for the flight's distance, duration and altitude.

The artwork was named Aerocene Pacha, after Saraceno's Aerocene Foundation and the Andean concept of the cosmos, Pacha. Saraceno worked together with local representatives of 33 indigenous communities of the Salinas Grandes for the project, including Tres Pozos, Inti Killa de Tres Morros (El Moreno), Pozo Colorado and San Miguel del Colorado. Members of these communities opened the flight launch event with ritual ceremonies to bless Pachamama – mother earth. They also spoke out to protest the exploitation of their traditional lands and rights by extractive industries. Aerocene Pacha flew bearing their slogan ‘Water and life are worth more than lithium.’

Lali Chalabe, a legal representative of the indigenous communities of Salinas Grandes spoke at the event, in addition to Professor Maristella Svampa, an Argentinian writer and theorist specialized in extractivism and indigenous rights.

The experiment was commissioned by the K-Pop superstars BTS, through the global public art project, called CONNECT BTS, which supported art projects in five cities around the world.

Museo Aero Solar 
The "Museo Aero Solar" group is an open-source international community, initiated in 2008 by Tomás Saraceno in conversation with Alberto Pesavento. The community organizes events around the world to turn plastic bags into lighter-than-air sculptures, creating airborne flying museums. Sending a message for sustainability, Museo Aero Solar retakes and transforms a pollutant. The resulting collection includes more than 20,000 plastic bags culled from countries including Colombia, Cuba, France, Germany, Italy, Austria, Palestine, Switzerland, the United Arab Emirates and the United States, amongst others.

Aerosolar sculptures 
Aerosolar sculptures were officially presented during the United Nations Climate Change Conference COP21, at Grand Palais, Paris, 2015, shortly after the world first prototype (the D-0 AEC) test in the White Sands Dunes of New Mexico. On November 8, 2015, the D-0 AEC made its maiden voyage as the most sustainable flight, without fossil-fuel, solar panel, helium or batteries: During approximately 2 hours and 15 minutes, seven people were lifted up in White Sands' desert landscape only through the heat of the sun. With a net lift of more than 250 kg, the payload of the D-0 AEC aerosolar sculpture has no precedent in the long history of manned solar balloon flight attempts.

Aerocene Backpack 
The Aerocene Backpack is a flight kit. Participants can hack the devices pack, create their own lightweight sensors, and lift them up. Data collected with the Aerocene Backpack can be uploaded and shared with Aerocene's open-source online community, via an interactive website that encourages participants all over the world to share their experiments, photos and videos, comments, and innovations.

Aerocene App 
Beginning in 2012 and based on a concept and long-term research by artist Tomás Saraceno, the Aerocene App is based on the Float Predictor, an online digital tool developed by the Aerocene Foundation and Studio Tomás Saraceno in collaboration with Lodovica Illari, Glenn Flierl, and Bill McKenna from the Department of Earth, Atmospheric and Planetary Sciences (EAPS) at the Massachusetts Institute of Technology (MIT), together with Center for Art, Science & Technology  (CAST) with further support from Imperial College London, Radioamateur, and the UK High Altitude Society.

The Aerocene App developed by Tomas Saraceno consists of a global forecasting system using open meteorological data to predict flight paths of aerosolar sculptures circling around the globe without  emissions. The app incorporates real-time information from 16-day forecasts of wind speeds at different altitudes.

Arachnophilia 
Arachnophilia is a not-for-profit, interdisciplinary spider/web research community. Building on the innovations arising from Saraceno's collaborative research into spider/web architectures, materials, modes of vibrational signaling and behaviour, the broad aim of Arachnophilia is to increase visibility and change people's perceptions of spiders and webs within the context of the current ecological crisis.

Hybrid Webs 
The secondary output of the research conducted in the Arachnid Research Lab are the Hybrid Webs - the collective term for a series of sculptures devised by Saraceno. Each sculpture, made entirely of spider silk is designed to appear as a unique, geometric galaxy floating in infinite space. Creating the sculptures means incorporating webs woven by spiders who are social, asocial or between the two. During the building period, the sculptures are turned onto each side, allowing gravity to aid the interweaving of silk from different sorts of spider. The works' titles reveal the technical specifications of each sculptural element; the genus and species of spiders employed and the time taken by each spider to complete its web. The final sculpture is thereby an emblem of an encounter which might not otherwise have succeeded, and so prompts a reflection on human coexistence with ourselves and the natural world.

Hybrid Webs have been exhibited worldwide:

"May you live in interesting times", Venice Biennale, curated by Ralph Rugoff (2019).
"ON AIR", Carte blanche to Tomás Saraceno at Palais de Tokyo, curated by Rebecca Lamarche-Vadel (2018-2019).
Tanya Bonakdar Gallery, New York and at Palais de Tokyo, Paris (2018).
Pinksummer Contemporary Art, Rome (2016).
Istanbul Design Biennial, Istanbul (2016).
11th Shanghai Biennial, Shanghai (2016).
Senckenberg Museum, Frankfurt (2016).
UC Berkeley Art Museum and Pacific Film Archive, Berkeley, USA (2016).
MARCO, Museum for Contemporary Art, Monterrey, Mexico (2016).
Cultural Center; Espace Muraille, Geneva (2015).
Chicago Architectural Biennial, Chicago (2015).
Louvre Museum, Paris (2015).
Georg Kolbe Museum, Berlin (2014).
Museo di Villa Croce, Genoa, Italy (2014).
Esther Schipper, Berlin (2012).

Arachnomancy App 
On the occasion of the 2019 Venice Biennale, Tomás Saraceno launched the Arachnomancy App. Through this app, users are encouraged to notice, document and map spider webs they encounter in both wild and urban spaces. This app also uses the Arachnophilia biotremology archives to realise vibratory modes of interspecies communication that mobile devices make possible.

As users upload images, the Arachnophilia team attempts to add species or web-typographic information and geographical context, where possible. These photos and data populate a dynamic, global map. In turn, this map and the data it collects has the potential to generate an important resource and tool for researchers tracking species diversity - a dynamic archive of spider web biodiversity.

Arachnid Orchestra Jam Session 
Saraceno has also developed a line of inquiry into the sound properties of spider webs. In collaboration with arachnologists, musicians and sound engineers based in Singapore and elsewhere, Saraceno has harnessed the structural properties of spider silk, transforming the web into a musical instrument. Since spiders do not possess an auditory system, they perceive the world around them with pressure and vibrations that come from their own movement, for example web-plucking. A cobweb is therefore a sensory object, an extension of a spider's body and the vibrations communicated via this practice are used for attraction, hunting and other social interactions. Saraceno has succeeded in amplifying these inaudible vibrations and web-pluckings into acoustic rhythms. This was presented by Saraceno at the 'Arachnid Orchestra Jam Session', curated by Ute Meta Bauer at the NTU Centre for Contemporary Art Singapore (2015). The focus of this exhibition, which included a run of live performances, was to push the boundaries of interspecies communication. This insight into non-human modes of communication helped formulate a more complex understanding of interspecies cohabitation – an idea at the fore of Saraceno's vision.

This research has also been presented in the major solo exhibition 'Cosmic Jive' at Villa Croce Museum of Contemporary Art (2014) and Saraceno's first solo exhibition in his native Argentina titled 'How to Entangle the Universe in a Spider Web' at the Museo de Arte Moderno, Buenos Aires (2017).

Nggàm dù 
In 2021, the durational community project Nggàm dù was launched as part of the Berliner Festspiele’s Immersion programme. Described as “a web portal by, with and for the spider diviners of Somié, Cameroon”, Nggàm dù invites audiences to learn about the historic, trans-generational practice of ŋgam dù divination that is practiced across the borderlands of Cameroon and Nigeria, consult with the spider oracle for an agreed donation, and in turn support locally-run projects throughout the village.

Selected works and projects

Cloud Cities 

Saraceno's long-term artistic research project (2002–present) draws inspiration from Buckminster Fuller and other radical architects. The aim of the project is to create a modular, transnational city in the clouds, the realization of which would be a new model for liberating and sustainable building practices.

The exhibition Cloud Cities, presented at Hamburger Bahnhof - Museum für Gegenwart in Berlin (2011–12), consisted of a collection of geometric, inflated shapes that challenge the notions of place, space, future and gravity. Through the exhibition, Saraceno sought to explain how human beings live in combination with their environment. 
As curator and art historian Moritz Wesseler notes, "an aspect that is of great importance to Saraceno in this context is that the city's shape and size can be changed continually, subjecting conventional ideas about boundaries and territories to critical scrutiny. (...) The works he creates as part of this exploration can be considered components of sorts for the future cloud-city that can be assembled to create the desired complex in its entirety. But the components also exist in isolation, as independent sculptures or installations, evincing forces and qualities of their own that render them highly fascinating constructs."

Observatory/Airport City 
Related to Cloud Cities, Saraceno launched an exhibition 'Observatory/Air-Port-City' at the Hayward Gallery, London (2008). The exhibition was composed of a collection of spheres, each housing autonomous residential units. The network of habitable cells float in the air, combining and recombining like clouds, constructing a flying airport. This is Saraceno's utopic vision: to create a new airborne nomadism.

On the Roof: Cloud City 
Saraceno exhibited 'On the Roof: Cloud City' in the Iris and B Gerald Cantor Roof Garden at the Metropolitan Museum of Art (MET) New York City (2012). This consisted of a constellation of sixteen large, interconnected modules composed of glass segments and cut in non-identical geometric shapes held in place by steel joints, reinforcements and steel cables. Visitors were able to walk through the installation, which draws its shape from bacteria, clouds, universes, foam and neural communication networks.

In Orbit 
In Orbit, installed since June 2013 at K21 Ständehaus, Düsseldorf, spans Saraceno's inquiries into urbanism, natural engineering and communication. Curated by Marion Ackermann, the installation hangs more than 25 meters above the piazza of the K21.
Saraceno's installation combines the structure of a spider's web with the vision of Cloud Cities. Over 400,000 visitors to the exhibition have strolled, climbed, laid, on a 2,500 sqm web, dotted with massive inflated PVC spheres. The movement of each participant is felt by others, exhibiting a potential for new modes of human communication.

On Space Time Foam 
'On Space Time Foam', an installation by Saraceno and curated by Andrea Lissoni, was inspired by the cubic shape of the exhibition space at HangarBicocca, Milan, appearing there in 2013. The structure was composed of three levels of thin, clear film fixed to the walls and floating at a height of 14 to 20 metres, covering an area of 400 square metres. Visitors were granted access to three levels of the artwork, finding themselves in mid-air, encouraging the loss of spatial coordination. 
HangarBicocca has a cubic form.

The cube, a geometric form often used by scientists to represent the concepts of space and time, inspired Saraceno to create an installation in which the visitors' movements enact the time variable, thereby introducing the concept of the fourth dimension within the three-dimensional space. The title of the work can be traced to quantum mechanics on the origins of the universe, distinguished by the idea of extremely fast-moving subatomic particles that can trigger changes in spatio-temporal matter. Freely inspired by these theories, Saraceno makes their movements metaphorically visible. The installation is a device that calls perceptual certainties into question; it is an element that modifies the architecture containing it, a structure that makes the interrelationships among people and visible space, an attempt to overcome the laws of gravity.
As the artist explained, "the films constituting the living core of HangarBicocca are constantly altered by climate and the simple movement of people. Each step, each breath, modifies the entire space: it is a metaphor for how our interrelations affect the Earth and other universes."

Solar Bell 
Saraceno has developed a Solar Bell flying sculpture made of lightweight and sustainable materials. Its design is based on the modular tetrahedron, or four-sided pyramid, invented by Alexander Graham Bell during his early investigations into manned flight. Bell made important discoveries in the field of aviation and frame construction, and happened upon the strongest geometrical structure known in the cosmos, the octet truss. This was the same spaceframe that Buckminster Fuller later followed for his Geodesic dome. 
'Solar Bell' was the final project in a series of artworks created to accompany the expansion of the Port of Rotterdam with the construction of Maasvlakte 2 in the Netherlands in 2013. 
Solar Bell Ensemble, Contemporary Arts Center, Cincinnati, USA 2016.

Flying Plaza 
Inspired by Solar Bell, Saraceno developed the idea of entire cities built upon lighter-than-air structures and sustainable energy technologies, lifted by the wind and suspended above the surface of the Earth. This 'flying plaza' represents an inquiry into public space, which according to Saraceno's vision, can be erected in alternative and fossil-free ways. Saraceno imagines spaces of dwellings as new urban skyscapes: flying buildings elevated by wind power alone, which erase the boundaries defined by geopolitics, and start to respond to local specificities.

Stillness in Motion - Cloud Cities 
Stillness in Motion — Cloud Cities, was launched by Saraceno and curated by Joseph Becker at the San Francisco Museum of Modern Art (SFMoMA), San Francisco in 2016. Organized by the SFMOMA Architecture and Design department, the exhibition comprises an immersive, site-specific cloudscape installation of suspended tension structures and floating sculptures, as well as explorations of the intricate constructions of spider webs.

Exhibitions 
Saraceno's work has been widely exhibited internationally in solo and group exhibitions. Most notably, these include:
 Particular Matter(s) at The Shed, New York, curated by Emma Enderby (2022).
 We do not all breathe the same air, neugerriemschneider gallery, Berlin (2021). 
 AnarcoAracnoAnacroArcano, Parco Archeologico della Neapolis, Syracuse, curated by Paolo Falcone (2021).
 Du Sol au Soleil, Domaine des Etangs, Massignac, curated by Rebecca Lamarche-Vadel /2021).
 Event Horizon: Tomás Saraceno at Cisternerne, Copenhagen (2020).
 Aria, at Palazzo Strozzi, Florence, Italy, curated by Arturo Galansino (2020)
 Aero(s)cene: When breath becomes air, when atmospheres become the movement for a post fossil fuel era against carbon-capitalist clouds and Spider/Web Pavilion 7, at "May you live in interesting times", Venice Biennale, curated by Ralph Rugoff (2019).
 ON AIR, Carte blanche to Tomás Saraceno at Palais de Tokyo, curated by Rebecca Lamarche-Vadel (2018-2019).
 In orbit, at Kunstsammlung Nordrhein-Westfalen K21, Düsseldorf (2013-2016, 2017- ongoing).
 Aerocene, at Solutions COP21, Grand Palais, Paris (2015).
 Arachnid Orchestra. Jam Sessions, at NTU Centre for Contemporary Art Singapore (2015).
 Cloud Cities, at Hamburger Bahnhof, Berlin (2011–12).
 On the Roof: Cloud City, at The Metropolitan Museum of Art, New York (2012).
His work is housed in many international collections.

Permanent installations 
2019, Sundial for Spatial Echoes, Bauhaus Museum Weimar, Weimar, Germany.
2017, Gravitational Waves, Z33 Kunstencentrum, Genk, Belgium. 
2017, Stillness in Motion - 3 Airborne Self-Assemblies, Singapore, Singapore.
2017, Cloud Cities – Nebulous Thresholds, Rollins College, Florida, USA. 
2017, On Cosmic Clouds, NYU Abu Dhabi Library, Abu Dhabi, UAE.
2016, Cloud Cities: HAT-P-12, Taipei, Taiwan.
2016, Caelum Dust, University of South Florida, Tampa, USA.
2015, Cloud Cities / Air-Port-City, Domaine du Muy, Parc de sculptures contemporaines, France.
2015, Sundial for Spatial Echoes, Aker Brygge, Oslo, Norway.
2008, On clouds (Air-Port-City), Towada Art Center, Towada, Japan.
2007, Flying Garden, European Patent Office (EPO) Munich, Germany.

Collections 
Saraceno's work is represented in public and private collections including:

Miami Art Museum, Miami, FL, USA.
Museum für Moderne Kunst, Frankfurt, Germany.
Klassik Stiftung Weimar, Weimar, Germany.
Museum of Modern Art, New York, USA.
San Francisco Museum of Modern Art, San Francisco, CA, USA.
Walker Art Center, Minneapolis, MN, USA.
Nationalgalerie, Staatliche Museen zu Berlin, Berlin, Germany.
Bonniers Konsthall, Stockholm, Sweden.
The National Gallery of Denmark, Copenhagen, Denmark.
Esbjerg Kunstmusem, Esbjerg, Denmark.
Istanbul Modern Art Museum, Istanbul, Turkey.
Hamburger Bahnhof – Museum für Gegenwart, Berlin, Germany.
Boros Collection, Berlin, Germany.
The Collection of Juan Vergez, Buenos Aires, Argentina.
BSI Art Collection, Switzerland.
Mudam Musée d‘Art Moderne Grand-Duc Jean, Luxembourg.
Collezione La Gaia, Busca, Italy.
Fondazione Pierluigi e Natalina Remotti, Camogli, Italy.
Fondazione Morra Greco, Naples, Italy.
Fondazione Edoardo Garrone, Genoa, Italy.
Luma Foundation, Zurich, Switzerland.
Reykjavik Art Museum, Reykjavik, Iceland.

Publications 

Saraceno, Tomás. 2020. Aria. Ed. Marsilio Editori.
Saraceno, Tomás. 2018. Wallpaper Magazine, Guest Editor.
Saraceno, Tomás with Etienne Turpin and Christine Shaw. 2018. The work of the wind: (Volume I) Land. (Light Breeze – Stillness in Motion) K. Verlag. Berlin.
Saraceno, Tomás. 2018. Aerographies. Ed. Fosun Foundation.
Saraceno, Tomás. 2018. Palais 28 ON AIR. Ed. Palais de Tokyo.
Saraceno, Tomás. 2017. Our Interplanetary Bodies. Ed. Asia Cultural Center.
Saraceno, Tomás. 2017. How to Entangle the Universe in a Spiderweb. Ed. Pamphlet, Moderno.
Saraceno, Tomás. 2017. Flying Plaza. Ed. Spector Books, Berlin.
Saraceno, Tomás. 2017. Aerocene. Ed. SKIRA, Milan.
Saraceno, Tomás. 2017. Arachnid Orchestra. Jam Sessions. Ed. Ute Meta Bauer. Singapore: NTU Centre for Contemporary Art.
Saraceno, Tomás. 2017. Notes on Aerocene. Ed. Studio Tomás Saraceno, Aerocene Foundation.
Saraceno, Tomás. 2017. Aerosolar Journeys. Ed. Schaschl, Sabine, Zechlin, René. Berlin: Walter König.
Saraceno, Tomás. 2016. Tomás Saraceno. 163,000 Light Years. Monterrey: MARCO, Museo de Arte Contemporáneo de Monterrey.
Saraceno, Tomás. 2015. Aerocene. Berlin: Studio Tomás Saraceno.
Saraceno, Tomás, and Mario Codognato. 2015. Tomás Saraceno: Becoming Aerosolar. Vienna: Belvedere.
Saraceno, Tomás, and Joseph Grima. 2014. Cosmic Jive: The Spider Sessions. Genoa: Asinello Press.
Saraceno, Tomás, Meredith Malone, Igor Marjanović, Inés Katzenstein, and D. L Weaire. 2014. Tomás Saraceno: Cloud Specific. Chicago: University of Chicago Press.
Saraceno, Tomás, and Sara Arrhenius. 2011. Tomás Saraceno: 14 Billions (Working Title). Milan: Skira.
Saraceno, Tomás, Marion Ackermann, Daniel Birnbaum, Udo Kittelmann, and Hans Ulrich Obrist. 2011. Cloud Cities. Berlin: Distanz Verlag.
Saraceno, Tomás, and Juliane von Herz. 2010. Tomás Saraceno: Cloud Cities/Air-Port-City. Bielefeld: Kerber Verlag.

Awards 
2022, Platinum Konex Award for his work in the last decade.
2019, The Golden Madonnina, The Design Prize - In the artistic realm.
2010, 1822 Kunstpreis.
2009, Alexander Calder Prize.

Personal life 
Saraceno lives and works in Berlin.

References

Online references 
 World's first fully solar certified manned flight 
 53rd Venice Biennale 
 UN Climate Change Conference Paris COP21 
 L'Observatoire de l'Espace 
 Department of Earth, Atmospheric and Planetary Sciences (EAPS), 
 Calder Prize 
 TBA21 Academy  
 Museo Aero Solar 
 Becoming Aerosolar 
 Hayward Gallery 
 Hangar Bicocca 
 K21 Kunstsammlung Nordrhein-Westfalen

External links
https://studiotomassaraceno.org/
https://aerocene.org/
http://arachnophilia.net/

Argentine artists
Argentine contemporary artists
1973 births
Living people